Bernard Jean Étienne Arnault (born 5 March 1949) is a French business magnate, investor, and art collector. He is the founder, chairman, and chief executive officer of LVMH Moët Hennessy Louis Vuitton, the world's largest luxury goods company. Arnault has an estimated net worth of  billion , according to Forbes, making him the wealthiest person in the world. His family is also considered one of the richest families in the world.

Early life 
Bernard Jean Étienne Arnault was born on 5 March 1949 in Roubaix. His mother, Marie-Josèphe Savinel, daughter of Étienne Savinel, had a "fascination for Dior".  His father, manufacturer Jean Léon Arnault, a graduate of École Centrale Paris, owned the civil engineering company Ferret-Savinel.

Career

Arnault was educated at the Lycée Maxence Van Der Meersch in Roubaix, and the Lycée Faidherbe in Lille. In 1971, he graduated from the École Polytechnique, France's leading engineering school, and began work for his father's company. Three years later, after he convinced his father to shift the focus of the company to real estate, Ferret-Savinel sold the industrial construction division and was renamed Ferinel. Following the acquisition of a textile company and relocation of its headquarters, the company renamed the real estate branch to the George V Group. The real estate assets were later sold to Compagnie Générale des Eaux (CGE), eventually becoming Nexity.

1971–1987: Professional start 
Arnault began his career in 1971, at Ferret-Savinel, and was its president from 1978 to 1984. In 1984, Arnault, then a young real estate developer, heard that the French government was set to choose someone to take over the Boussac Saint-Frères empire, a textile and retail conglomerate that owned Christian Dior.

With the help of Antoine Bernheim, a senior partner of Lazard Frères, Arnault acquired the Financière Agache, a luxury goods company. He became the CEO of Financière Agache and subsequently won the bidding war for Boussac Saint-Frères, buying the group for a ceremonial one franc and effectively took control of Boussac Saint-Frères. Along with Christian Dior, Boussac's assets included the department store Le Bon Marché, the retail shop Conforama, and the nappy manufacturer Peaudouce. 

After Arnault bought Boussac, he laid off 9,000 workers in two years, after which he acquired the nickname "The Terminator". He then sold nearly all of the company's assets, keeping only the Christian Dior brand and Le Bon Marché department store. By 1987, the company was profitable again and booked earnings of $112 million on a revenue stream of 1.9 billion dollars.

1987–1989: Co-founding and acquisition of LVMH 
 He worked with Alain Chevalier, CEO of Moët Hennessy, and Henry Racamier, president of Louis Vuitton, to form LVMH in 1987.

In July 1988, Arnault provided $1.6 billion to form a holding company with Guinness that held 24% of LVMH's shares. In response to rumors that the Louis Vuitton group was buying LVMH's stock to form a "blocking minority", Arnault spent $600 million to buy 13.5% more of LVMH, making him LVMH's largest shareholder. LVMH had been created on the premise that the conglomerate would be too large for a single hostile raider. However, the premise failed to take into account internal takeover attempts. The fault became too large to ignore when Arnault had a differing strategic vision from Henry Racamier, Louis Vuitton's president.

In January 1989, he spent another $500 million to gain control of a total of 43.5% of LVMH's shares and 35% of its voting rights, thus reaching the "blocking minority" that he needed to stop the dismantlement of the LVMH group. He then turned on Racamier, stripped him of his power, and ousted him from the board of directors. On 13 January 1989, he was unanimously elected chairman of the executive management board.

1989–2001: LVMH Initial expansion and growth 
After assuming leadership, Arnault led the company through an ambitious development plan, transforming it into one of the largest luxury groups in the world, alongside Swiss luxury giant Richemont and French-based Kering. In eleven years, annual sales and profit rose by a factor of 5, and the market value of LVMH increased by a factor of 15. In July 1988, Arnault acquired Céline. That same year, he sponsored French fashion designer Christian Lacroix to advertise the company's luxury clothing line. LVMH acquired Berluti and Kenzo in 1993, the same year Arnault bought out the French economic newspaper La Tribune. La Tribune never achieved the desired success, despite his 150 million euro investment, and he sold it in November 2007 to buy a different French economic newspaper, Les Échos, for €240 million.

In 1994, LVMH acquired the perfume firm Guerlain. In 1996, Arnault bought out Loewe, followed by Marc Jacobs and Sephora in 1997. Five more brands were also integrated into the group: Thomas Pink in 1999, Emilio Pucci in 2000 and Fendi, DKNY and La Samaritaine in 2001.

In the 1990s, Arnault decided to develop a center in New York to manage LVMH's presence in the United States. He chose Christian de Portzamparc to supervise this project. The result was the LVMH Tower that opened in December 1999. That same year, Arnault turned his eyes on Gucci, an Italian leather goods company, which was run by Tom Ford and Domenico De Sole. He discreetly amassed a 5 percent stake in the company before being detected. Gucci responded hostilely and called it a "creeping takeover." Upon being noticed, Arnault upped his stake to 34.4 percent while insisting he wanted to be a supportive and unassertive stakeholder. De Sole proposed that in return for board representation, Arnault would stop increasing his stake in Gucci. However, Arnault refused to accept these terms. De Sole discovered a loophole that allowed him to issue shares with only board approval, and for every share LVMH bought, he created more for his employees, diluting Arnault's stake. The fight dragged on until settlement in September 2001. After the legal ruling, LVMH sold its shares and walked away with $700 million in profit.

In 1998, with businessman Albert Frère, Arnault purchased Château Cheval Blanc in a personal capacity. LVMH acquired Arnault's share in 2009 to add to the group's other wine property Château d'Yquem.

From 1998 to 2001, Arnault invested in a variety of web companies such as Boo.com, Libertysurf, and Zebank through his holding Europatweb. Groupe Arnault also invested in Netflix in 1999.

2001–present: Increasing success and profitability 

In 2007, Blue Capital announced that Arnault owned jointly with the California property firm Colony Capital 10.69% of France's largest supermarket retailer and the world's second-largest food distributor Carrefour.

In 2008, he entered the yacht business and bought Princess Yachts for 253 million euros. He subsequently took control of Royal van Lent for an almost identical amount.

From 2010 until 2013, Arnault was a member of the Board of Advisors of the Malaysian 1MDB fund.

On 7 March 2011, Arnault announced the acquisition of 50.4% of family-owned shares of the Italian jeweler Bulgari, to make a tender offer for the rest, which was publicly owned. The transaction was worth $5.2 billion. In 2011, Arnault invested $641 million in establishing LCapitalAsia. On 7 March 2013, National Business Daily reported that mid-priced clothing brand QDA would open stores with the assistance of Arnault's private equity firm LCapitalAsia and Chinese apparel company Xin Hee Co., Ltd. in Beijing.  In February 2014, Arnault entered into a joint venture with the Italian fashion brand Marco De Vincenzo, taking a minority 45% stake in the firm. In 2016, LVMH sold DKNY to G-III Apparel Group. In April 2017, Arnault announced the acquisition of Christian Dior haute couture, leather, both men and women's ready-to-wear, and footwear lines, which integrated the entire Christian Dior brand within LVMH.

By January 2018, Arnault had led the company to record sales of €42.6 billion in 2017, 13% over the previous year, as all divisions turned in strong performances. That same year, the net profit increased by 29%. In November 2019, Arnault planned to acquire Tiffany & Co. for approximately US $16.2 billion. The deal was expected to close by June 2020. LVMH then stated in September 2020 indicating that the takeover would not proceed and that the deal was "invalid" because Tiffany handled the business during the COVID-19 pandemic. Subsequently, Tiffany filed suit against LVMH, asking the court to compel the purchase or to assess damages against the defendant; LVMH planned to counter sue, alleging that mismanagement had invalidated the purchase agreement. In mid-September 2020, a reliable source told  Forbes that the reason for Arnault's decision to cancel the Tiffany purchase was purely financial: Tiffany was paying millions in dividends to shareholders despite a financial loss of US$32 million during the pandemic. Upon examination of financial records, Arnault discovered that some US$70 million had already been paid out by Tiffany, with an additional US$70 million scheduled to be paid in November 2020. LVMH filed a counterclaim against the court action commenced by Tiffany; a statement issued by LVMH blamed Tiffany's mismanagement during the pandemic and claimed that it was "burning cash and reporting losses". In late October 2020, Tiffany and LVMH agreed to the original takeover plan, though at a slightly reduced price of nearly $16 billion, a minor reduction of 2.6% from the aforementioned deal. The new deal reduced the amount paid per share by LVMH from the original price of $135 to $131.50. LVMH completed the purchase of Tiffany in January 2021.

Under Arnault's leadership, LVMH has grown to become the largest company by market capitalization in the eurozone, with a record of 313 billion euros ($382 billion) as of May 2021. Arnault has promoted decisions towards decentralizing the group's brands as a business strategy. As a result of these measures, brands under the LVMH umbrella such as Tiffany are still viewed as independent firms with their history.

Art collection 
Arnault's collection includes work by Picasso, Yves Klein, Henry Moore, and Andy Warhol. He was also instrumental in establishing LVMH as a significant patron of art in France. The LVMH Young Fashion Designer was created as an international competition open to students from fine-arts schools. Every year, the winner is awarded a grant to support the creation of the designer's label and with a year of mentorship. 

From 1999 to 2003, he owned Phillips de Pury & Company, an art auction house, and bought out the first French auctioneer, Tajan. In 2006, Arnault started the building project of the Louis Vuitton Foundation. Dedicated to the creation and contemporary art, the building was designed by the architect Frank Gehry. The Foundation's grand opening at the Jardin d'Acclimatation Paris was held on 20 October 2014.

Personal life

Family 
In 1973, he married Anne Dewavrin, together having two children, Delphine and Antoine. They separated in 1990.  In 1991, he married Hélène Mercier, a Canadian concert pianist, together having three children, Alexandre, Frédéric, and Jean. Arnault and Mercier live in Paris. All five children — Delphine, Antoine, Alexandre, Frédéric, and Jean — have official roles in brands controlled by Arnault, along with his niece Stephanie Watine Arnault. 

Alexandre is the EVP of Tiffany & Co, Frédéric is the CEO of TAG Heuer, and Jean is the Director of Marketing and Development at Louis Vuitton. Since 2010, Arnault's daughter Delphine has been the partner of Xavier Niel, a French billionaire businessman active in the telecommunications and technology industry. Effective February 1, 2023, Delphine is the Chief Executive Officer of the luxury brand Dior.

Wealth 
In April 1999, he became the richest person in fashion, topping Zara's Amancio Ortega. In 2016, Arnault was paid €7.8 million as the CEO of the LVMH group. In July 2019, Arnault became the second-richest man in the world, with a net worth of $103 billion. Arnault briefly surpassed Jeff Bezos to become the richest person in the world in December 2019, and again for a short time in January 2020. During the COVID-19 pandemic, Arnault saw his wealth shrink by $30 billion as sales of luxury goods plummeted. 

On 5 August 2021, he regained the status of the wealthiest man in the world, with his net worth climbing to $198.4 billion. This occurred as sales of LVMH's luxury goods surged in China and other parts of Asia. He is listed as "Bernard Arnault & Family" on the Forbes Billionaires list. Forbes estimates the Bernard Arnault & Family fortune to be $158 billion in 2022, positioning him ahead of Bill Gates.

Arnault owned the  converted research vessel Amadeus, which was sold in late 2015. His current  yacht Symphony was built in the Netherlands by Feadship. Arnault and his family have an estimated net worth of  billion as of February 2023 according to Forbes, making him the richest person in the world, surpassing Elon Musk.

Request for Belgian citizenship 
In 2013, it was disclosed that Arnault planned to apply for Belgian citizenship and was considering moving to Belgium. In April 2013, Arnault said that he had been misquoted and that he never intended to leave France: "I repeatedly said that I would stay as a resident in France and that I would continue to pay my taxes... Today, I decided to remove any ambiguity. I withdraw my request for Belgian nationality. Requesting Belgian nationality was to better protect the foundation that I created with the sole purpose of ensuring the continuity and integrity of the LVMH group if I were to disappear." 

On 10 April 2013, Arnault announced he had decided to abandon his application for Belgian citizenship, saying he did not want the move to be misinterpreted as a measure of tax evasion, at a time when France faced economic and social challenges. Arnault also stated several employees requested to leave France for tax purposes but he declined their requests, explaining "the 75% tax would not raise a lot of revenue but should prove less divisive, as now it was set to be levied on firms rather than people, and only due to stay in place for two years."

Transport 
In October 2022 Arnault stated that LVMH sold its private jet after a Twitter user began to track its flights and stated he began renting private aircraft for his personal and business flights instead. The aircraft was a Bombardier Global 7500 which was registered F-GVMA.

Political views 
In the second round of the 2017 French presidential election, Arnault supported Emmanuel Macron. Brigitte Macron was the French teacher of Arnault's sons Frédéric and Jean when they were students at the Lycée Saint-Louis-de-Gonzague.

Awards and honours 
 Grand Officier of the Légion d'Honneur (France, 14 July 2011)
 Commandeur of the Ordre des Arts et des Lettres (France)
 Grand Officer of the Order of Merit of the Italian Republic (Italy, 2006)
 Medal of Pushkin (Russia, 2017)
 Honorary Knight Commander of the Most Excellent Order of the British Empire (UK, 2012)
 The Woodrow Wilson Award for Global Corporate Citizenship (2011)
 The Museum of Modern Art's David Rockefeller Award (March 2014)

See also 
 List of French billionaires by net worth

References

External links 
 Being LVMH's Bernard Arnault- Profile story from WSJ magazine
 A Guide to the Principal Holdings of Bernard Arnault also in WSJ magazine

1949 births
Living people
20th-century French businesspeople
21st-century French businesspeople
Bernard
Dior people
Directors of LVMH
École Polytechnique alumni
French art collectors
French billionaires
French businesspeople in fashion
French chairpersons of corporations
French chief executives
French cosmetics businesspeople
French investors
20th-century French philanthropists
Grand Officiers of the Légion d'honneur
Honorary Knights Commander of the Order of the British Empire
People named in the Paradise Papers
People from Roubaix
Centibillionaires
21st-century French philanthropists